Herbert Smith (22 November 1877 – 6 January 1951) was an English footballer who played in the Football League for Derby County and Stoke. He also competed in the 1908 Summer Olympics, playing at left-back.

Career
He was born in Witney, Oxfordshire, and was a member of the English team, which won the gold medal in the football tournament. He had previously made four appearances for the full England team in 1905 and 1906.

Smith played for a number of clubs including Reading and Oxford City as well as short spells with Football League clubs Stoke in 1902 and Derby County in 1906.

Career statistics

Club
Source:

International
Source:

References

External links
 
 
 
 
 Herbert Smith at EnglandFootballOnline.com

1877 births
1951 deaths
English footballers
Reading F.C. players
Derby County F.C. players
Stoke City F.C. players
Footballers at the 1908 Summer Olympics
Olympic footballers of Great Britain
English Olympic medallists
Olympic gold medallists for Great Britain
England international footballers
England amateur international footballers
People from Witney
Olympic medalists in football
Medalists at the 1908 Summer Olympics
Oxford City F.C. players
Association football fullbacks
English cricketers
Oxfordshire cricketers